Babergh may refer to the following places in England:

 Babergh Hundred, a defunct hundred of the county of Suffolk, named for a "mound of a man called Babba"
 Babergh District, a local government district in Suffolk, named after the hundred